Zubrzyca Dolna  is a village in the administrative district of Gmina Jabłonka, within Nowy Targ County, Lesser Poland Voivodeship, in southern Poland, close to the border with Slovakia.

The village lies in the drainage basin of the Black Sea (through Orava, Váh and Danube rivers), in the historical region of Orava (Polish: Orawa).

History
The area became part of Poland in the 10th or early 11th century, and later it passed to Hungary. In the late 19th century, Zubrzyca Dolna had a population of 934, 91.1% Polish. It became again part of Poland following World War I.

References

Villages in Nowy Targ County